The Interact Home Computer (also called The Interact Family Computer) is a 1978 American home computer made by Interact Electronics Inc of Ann Arbor, Michigan. It sold under the name "Interact Model One Home Computer". The original Interact Model One computer was designed by Rick Barnich and Tim Anderson at 204 E. Washington in Ann Arbor, then moving to the Georgetown Mall on Packard St. in Ann Arbor.

Interact Electronics Inc was a privately held company that was funded by Hongiman, Miller, Swartz and Cohn, a law firm out of Detroit. The President/Founder of Interact Electronics Inc was Ken Lochner, who was one of the original developers of the BASIC language based out of Dartmouth College. Ken had started Interact Electronics Inc after founding the successful computer time-sharing company Cyphernetics in Ann Arbor, which was purchased by ADP in 1975.

Only a few thousand Interacts were sold before the company went bankrupt in late 1979. Most were sold by the liquidator Protecto Enterprizes of Barrington, Illinois, through mail order sales. It was also sold at Highland Appliance in the Detroit area, Newman Computer Exchange in Ann Arbor, and Montgomery Wards in the Houston, TX, area.

The computer didn't with any operating system, but Microsoft BASIC V4.7 or EDU-BASIC (supplied with the computer) could be loaded from tape.

Probably the most successful application available for the Interact was a program called "Message Center".  With it, a store could program a scrolling message which appeared on a TV screen (such as advertisements, or a welcome message to guests).

Although it was mostly a game machine (with games such as Showdown, Blackjack and Chess), users could also create their own programs using the BASIC computer language. Customers began hooking up the Interact to control everything from lights in their house, doors, windows, smoke detectors, to a Chevrolet Corvette.

Later on the design was sold to a French company, Lambda Systems, and re-branded as the "Victor Lambda" for the French market.

Technical specifications
 CPU: Intel i8080, 2.0 MHz
 Memory: 8K RAM, expandable to 16K RAM; 2K ROM
 Keyboard: 53-key chiclet
 Display: 17 x 12 text; eight colors, 112 x 78 graphics, four colors
 Sound: SN76477 (One voice, four octaves)
 Ports: Television, two joysticks
 Built-in cassette recorder (1200 Bps)
 PSU: External AC transformer
 1980 price: US$300

References

External links 
 old-computers.com page for Interact
 interactfamilycomputer.com

Home computers
Computer-related introductions in 1978